Morcenx (Gascon: Morcens) is a former commune in the Landes department in Nouvelle-Aquitaine in southwestern France. On 1 January 2019, it was merged into the new commune Morcenx-la-Nouvelle.

Geography
Morcenx is situated in the Grande Lande in the Landes forest (forêt des Landes) on the Bez. It is accessed by the A63 motorway, exit 14 for Onesse-et-Laharie.

History
The Morcenx area, bordered by the Bez and its tributaries, seems to have been occupied since prehistoric times. Flint tools, domestic furniture, and a cinerary (cremation ashes) box from the 1st Iron Age have been found there.

The church Saint Pierre de Morcencz was mentioned in the Liber rubeus in the 12th century.

Population

See also
Communes of the Landes department

References

Former communes of Landes (department)